Anitha Pauldurai (born 22 June 1985, Chennai, Tamil Nadu) is an Indian basketball player who has been the captain of the India women's national basketball team. She played for 18 years on the Indian women's national team (2000 to 2017). Anitha is the first only Indian woman to have played nine Asian Basketball Confederation (ABC) championships continuously representing the national squad. Anitha has a record of 30 medals in national championships.

Anitha is the youngest ever to captain the Senior National Team at the age of 19 and went on to captain the national team for eight years. In August 2012, she was selected to play for an international women professional league in Thailand.

Anitha has played a number of international tournaments including big-ticket events such as the Asian championship, Commonwealth Games 2006 and Asian Games 2010. Anitha won the gold medal in 1st 3 on 3 FIBA Asian Basketball Championships at Doha 2013, gold medal in 3rd Asian beach games at Haiyan, China 2012, captain and top assists in the tournament, gold medal in south Asian beach games at Sri Lanka 2011 and silver medal in Asian indoor games at Vietnam 2009. She was awarded India's fourth highest civilian award, Padma Shri in 2021.

Personal life and education

Pauldurai, a resident of Chennai, started playing basketball at the age of 11 but admits that early on, she wasn't a fan of the sport. "I used to like volleyball and athletics more," she said, "But when I was in school, the basketball coach recommended that I try the game. The more I played, the more interested I became in the sport." She was graduate in B.Com. from Madras University & MBA (HRM) from Annamalai University. She joined Southern Railway 2003, now working as Officer on Special Duty, Ticket Checking.

Awards and achievements
 Padma Shri Award for Sports in 2021 - Fourth Highest Civilian Award in India.
 FEMINA Super Daughter Award 2021.
 Tamil Nadu Women achiever Award from the Brand Republic 2021.
 Life Time Achievement Award from Rotary Club Chennai Velachery 2021.
 Sports Women of the Year Award from Jeppiaar Institute of Technology 2021.
 Raindrops Women Achiever Award 2021.
 Best Sports Women Award from TN World Women Wing 2021.
 Wonder Women Award from Virisha Book of World Record 2021.
 Women Achiever Award from State Bank Of India 2019.
 Villayatu Ratna Award from News7 channel Tamil Ratna Awards 2018.
 Received Doctor of Letters (D.LITT) from DK International Research Foundation 2018.
 Lifetime Achievement Award from the Chief Minister of Tamil Nadu in senior National Basketball Championship at Chennai 2018.
 Women Achiever Award from Rajalakshmi Engineering College 2018.
 Young Achiever Award from International Youth Fest 2018.
 Women Achiever Award from Vels University 2017.
 Received Vikadan award for Golden Captain 2016.
 Chief Minister State Sports Award 2013.
 Awarded Top Plays of the Tournament 2013 FIBA Asian Women.
 Southern Railway General Manager's Railway Week Award for sports 2008.
 Best Player Award in 17th Youth Nationals at Vashi 2001.

International sporting achievements

National sporting achievements

See also 

 India women's national basketball team

References

  https://web.archive.org/web/20150402114734/http://london2012.fiba.com/pages/eng/fe/12/olym/player/p/pid/61600/sid/5189/tid/301/profile.html
  http://zeenews.india.com/tags/anitha-pauldurai.html
  http://hoopistani.blogspot.in/2012/08/geethu-anna-jose-and-anitha-paul-durai.html
  https://web.archive.org/web/20150402103654/http://www.deccanchronicle.com/131031/sports-other-sports/article/india-beats-kazakhstan-thriller
  http://www.gettyimages.in/detail/news-photo/basketball-player-anitha-pauldurai-of-team-india-in-action-news-photo/91155018
  http://www.sportskeeda.com/basketball/28th-ramu-memorial-basketball-tournament-southern-railway-81-maharashtra-49-women
  http://www.sportskeeda.com/basketball/ongc-men-and-tamil-nadu-women-win-27th-federation-cup-in-bangalore
  http://www.thehindu.com/todays-paper/tp-sports/article2320623.ece

Specific

External links 

 http://www.zimbio.com/pictures/0n2Gz_KtRdc/3rd+Asian+Beach+Games+Beach+Basketball+Day/iIzKfxUnN81/Anitha+Paul+Durai

 https://timesofindia.indiatimes.com/sports/more-sports/others/anitha-pauldurai-named-assistant-coach-of-indian-u-16-basketball-team/articleshow/61087406.cms
 https://www.fiba.basketball/womensasiacup/2017/divisionb/player/Anitha-Paul-Durai
 https://www.hotstar.com/tv/manin-maindhargal-son-of-the-soil/s-1953/in-conversation-with-anitha-pauldurai/1000230623

1985 births
Living people
Recipients of the Padma Shri in sports
Indian women's basketball players
Basketball players from Tamil Nadu
Sportspeople from Chennai
Commonwealth Games competitors for India
Basketball players at the 2010 Asian Games
Sportswomen from Tamil Nadu
20th-century Indian women
20th-century Indian people
Asian Games competitors for India
Shooting guards
Basketball players at the 2006 Commonwealth Games